Powertrans is an oil trading company in Turkey that was established in 2011.

In a controversial move, the company was given a monopoly on all the road and rail transportation of oil into Turkey from Iraqi Kurdistan. Turkish media reported in 2014 and 2015 that Powertrans has been accused of buying oil from the Islamic State of Iraq and the Levant.  Hacked e-mails have shown that Powertrans is connected to Berat Albayrak, son-in-law of the president of Turkey, Recep Tayyip Erdoğan. Albayrak had previously denied that he had any connection to Powertrans.

References

Oil and gas companies of Turkey
Energy companies established in 2011
Turkish companies established in 2011